The following is a list of international bilateral treaties between Australia and the Czech Republic

Early treaties were extended to Australia by the British Empire, however they are still generally in force.
Treaties of Czechoslovakia are still generally in force.
European Union treaties, which include the Czech Republic are not listed below.

References

Treaties of Australia
Treaties of the Czech Republic